Grissom may refer to:
 Grissom, North Carolina, unincorporated community 
 Grissom (surname)
Gus Grissom, one of the original NASA Project Mercury astronauts and pilot of Gemini 3
Gil Grissom, fictional character in the television series CSI: Crime Scene Investigation

Astronomical entities 
Grissom (crater), a lunar crater that lies on the far side of the Moon
Grissom Hill, one of the three Apollo 1 Hills on the planet Mars
2161 Grissom, an asteroid

Institutions 
Grissom Air Museum, an aerospace museum in Peru, Indiana, United States
Grissom Joint Air Reserve Base, formerly Grissom Air Force Base
Virgil I. Grissom High School, a high school in Huntsville, Alabama, United States; named in honor of the astronaut

Fictional characters 
Carl Grissom, a fictional character and an adversary of Batman in the 1989 Batman film; played by Jack Palance
 Cyrus "The Virus" Grissom, a fictional character in film Con Air
Gil Grissom, a fictional character from the TV series CSI: Crime Scene Investigation

Other 
Robert Grissom Parkway, a major four-lane connector highway in Myrtle Beach, South Carolina, United States
Island Grissom, one of the four THUMS Islands off Long Beach, California, United States

See also 
The Grissom Gang, a 1971 American period gangster film directed and produced by Robert Aldrich
 Grisham (disambiguation)
 Gresham (disambiguation)